This article presents lists of the literary events and publications in 1578.

Events
December – Publication of John Lyly's didactic prose romance Euphues: the Anatomy of Wyt, originating the ornate English prose style known as Euphuism.
unknown date – Alonso de Ercilla y Zúñiga is sent on a mission to Zaragoza by King Philip II of Spain.

New books

Prose
Diogo de Payva de Andrada – Defensio Tridentinæ fidei (posthumously published)
George Best – A True Discourse of the Late Voyages of Discoverie…under the Conduct of Martin Frobisher
John Florio – First Fruits
Jaroš Griemiller – Rosarium philosophorum
Gabriel Harvey – Smithus, vel Musarum lachrymae
John Lyly – Euphues: the Anatomy of Wit
Margaret Tyler, The Mirrour of Princely Deedes and Knighthood

Drama
Jan Kochanowski – Odprawa posłów greckich ("The Dismissal of the Greek Envoys")
George Whetstone – Promos and Cassandra

Poetry
See 1578 in poetry

Births
April 2 – Francesco Amico, Italian theologian
June – Mary Fitton, possible inspiration for Shakespeare's The Dark Lady (died 1647)
August 24 – John Taylor, English poet and waterman (died 1653)
unknown dates
Giambattista Andreini, Italian dramatist and actor (died 1650)
Jacob Bidermann, German dramatist (died 1627)
George Hakewill, English author and cleric (died 1649)

Deaths
May 4 – Martin Eisengrein, German  theologian and polemicist (born 1535)
July 27 – Jane Lumley, English translator from Greek and Latin (born 1537)
August 11 – Pedro Nunes, Portuguese polymath (born 1502)
October 12 – Cornelius Gemma, Dutch physician, astronomer and astrologer (born 1535)
unknown date – Gabriele Giolito de' Ferrari, Italian printer (born c. 1508)
probable – Johann Stumpf, Swiss writer on history and topography (born 1500)

References

Years of the 16th century in literature